Bernard Deshaies (born 11 December 1953, in Amos, Quebec) was a member of the House of Commons of Canada from 1993 to 1997. He is a businessperson by career.

He was elected in the Abitibi electoral district under the Bloc Québécois party in the 1993 federal election, thus serving in the 35th Canadian Parliament. He did not seek a second term in office and therefore left Canadian politics following the 1997 federal election.

External links
 

1953 births
Bloc Québécois MPs
Living people
Members of the House of Commons of Canada from Quebec
People from Amos, Quebec